East Paw Paw is an unincorporated community in DeKalb and Lee counties, Illinois, United States, located  east of Paw Paw.

References

Unincorporated communities in DeKalb County, Illinois
Unincorporated communities in Lee County, Illinois
Unincorporated communities in Illinois